Lincoln Center usually refers to Lincoln Center for the Performing Arts in New York City, U.S.

Lincoln Center may also refer to:

Places
Lincoln Center, Kansas, a small city, U.S.

Structures
Lincoln Center (Denver), a skyscraper, U.S.
Lincoln Center (Oregon), office complex in Tigard, Oregon, U.S.
701 Brickell Avenue, Miami, U.S. an office skyscraper known as The Lincoln Center until 2004
Fort Collins Lincoln Center, performing arts center in Colorado, U.S.

Other uses
66th Street–Lincoln Center (IRT Broadway–Seventh Avenue Line), subway station at Lincoln Center in New York, U.S.
Lincoln Center Historic District, Lincoln, Massachusetts, U.S.
Lincoln Center Institute, also known as Lincoln Center Education, the education division of Lincoln Center for the Performing Arts. New York, U.S.
The Lincoln Center for Family and Youth, also known as The Lincoln Center, a non-profit education and social services organization in Philadelphia, U.S.